This is a list of candidates for the Green Party of Canada in the 2011 federal election. Green Party candidates were present in 304 of the 308 total ridings, with only the ridings of Hamilton Centre, Etobicoke North, Willowdale, and Acadie-Bathurst left absent of Green Party candidates.

Newfoundland and Labrador - 7 seats

Prince Edward Island - 4 seats

Nova Scotia - 11 seats

New Brunswick - 10 seats

Quebec - 75 seats

Ontario - 106 seats

Manitoba - 14 Seats

Saskatchewan - 14 seats

Alberta - 28 seats

British Columbia - 36 seats

Yukon - 1 seat

Northwest Territories - 1 seat

Nunavut - 1 seat

See also
Results of the Canadian federal election, 2008
Results by riding for the Canadian federal election, 2008

References

External links
 Green Party of Canada website
 Elections Canada – List of Confirmed Candidates for the 41st General Election

 
Green Party of Canada candidates in Canadian Federal elections
candidates in the 2011 Canadian federal election